Last Train to Christmas is a 2021 Christmas fantasy comedy-drama film written and directed by Julian Kemp. The film was released on 18 December 2021 in the United Kingdom via Sky Cinema and Now.

Premise

On Christmas Eve 1985, Anthony "Tony" Towers, a successful nightclub manager, is engaged to his girlfriend Sue Taylor while travelling from London to Nottingham for a family reunion with his brother Roger. But when Tony walks into the next carriage forwards, he's transported to 1995 and discovers that he lost everything. He soon realizes that he's in a time warp and can travel through time via the number of carriages: Whenever he enters the next carriage in the direction the train is heading, he leaps 10 years forward. Whenever he enters the previous carriage, it's 10 years back.

Not only can he travel through the decades: He discovers that he also is able to change the history of the people travelling with him in the train, by changing former decisions in his life. But no matter when or how he changes his decisions, they always seem to come to desperate endings.

During one of these instances, Tony finds out from his depressed aunt that his marriage to Sue became strained due to his celebrity life. In desperation, Tony unwittingly travels back between 1955 and 1965, accidentally creating an alternate timeline where Roger has succumbed to the temptations Tony has endured. After a falling out with Roger in an alternate 1995 and noticing he's dead in 2005, Tony manages to change the timeline that ends with Roger getting arrested in 1975.

Upon entering an alternate 1985, Tony reunites with Sue. He encourages her to live out the life she deserves before bidding farewell. By travelling back to 1945 during his childhood, Tony is able to stop his aunt from abandoning Roger.

Returning to the present day 2015, a relieved Tony reunites with Roger, who plays on a piano at Nottingham station an original song they had written in their youth.

Cast

Production
The film, written and directed by Julian Kemp, was announced on 20 October 2021 ahead of its December release. It was produced by Sky Studios, Matt Williams of Future Artists Entertainment, and Matthew James Wilkinson of Stigma Films.

Michael Sheen and Nathalie Emmanuel were announced as the film's stars, followed by an announcement that Cary Elwes had also boarded the project.

Release

Marketing
A trailer was revealed on 24 November 2021. The film was included in Sky's festive slate.

See also
 List of Christmas films

References

External links
 

2021 fantasy films
2021 comedy-drama films
2020s Christmas comedy-drama films
British Christmas comedy-drama films
2020s fantasy comedy-drama films
Films about time travel
Films set in 1945
Films set in 1955
Films set in 1965
Films set in 1975
Films set in 1985
Films set in 1995
Films set in 2005
Films set in 2015
Films set in Nottingham
Films set on trains
Films about dysfunctional families
Time loop films
Films directed by Julian Kemp
2020s English-language films
2020s British films